Willem John Stanley Puddy (born 4 October 1987) is an English professional footballer who plays as a goalkeeper.

Career

Youth career
Born in Warminster, Puddy began his career as a youth player with Bristol City, spending seven years with the side before being released.

Cheltenham Town
In 2006, he joined Cheltenham Town, spending time on loan at Mangotsfield United, Yate Town, Stafford Rangers and Tamworth to gain experience, before being handed his professional debut for Cheltenham on 2 May 2009 in a 2–0 defeat to Southend United.

At the start of the 2009–10 season, Puddy joined Conference South side Bath City on a three-month loan deal, making four appearances before returning to Cheltenham after sustaining an injury.

He was released by the club along with 7 other players in May 2010, and began training with Wolverhampton Wanderers as he recovered from an ankle operation.

Salisbury City
On 25 October 2010, he played a game on his return from his ankle operation Salisbury City. Start in the Red Insure Cup against Wimborne Town.

On 5 November 2010, he joined Swindon Supermarine to be able to play in the 2nd round F.A. Cup game against Colchester United.

Chippenham Town
On 13 August 2011, Will joined Chippenham Town. He made his first appearance for the club later that day in a Southern Football League Premier Division game against Stourbridge.
He left in January 2012 to play for Salisbury City.

Salisbury City
After leaving Chippenham, he returned to Salisbury City. He spent the rest of the 2011–12 season with The Whites, only losing one game in a Salisbury City Shirt helping secure a strong finish to the season.

He then committed to the club again signing for the 2012–13 season during the pre–season period. Will went on to play over 40 games in the 2012–13 season ending in The Whites winning promotion by the way of the playoffs.

During the pre–season period before the 2013–14 season, Mikey Harris signed Will on for the upcoming season stating that he had full faith in Will, and believed that he would continue to do well. Will played an integral role in pre-season, playing pretty much every minute. Will went on to play much of the 2013–14 season, again appearing over 40 times in the league with 14 clean sheets, ending in being awarded the player's player of the season award by his fellow professionals.

Bristol Rovers
On 11 August 2014, he joined Bristol Rovers on non-contract terms. He started for Bristol Rovers in the 2015 Conference Premier play-off Final against Grimsby Town on 17 May 2015, and was substituted for Steve Mildenhall during the stoppage time of extra with the score at 1–1. Rovers went on to win the penalty shoot-out 5–3. Puddy made his return to the Bristol Rovers team in the EFL Trophy 1–0 defeat to Portsmouth. Puddy proceeded to play in the league on 10 December 2016 in a 4–2 victory over Bury.

Braintree Town

On 23 September 2016, Puddy joined Braintree Town on a one-month loan deal from Bristol Rovers. Puddy made his debut for the club in a 1–0 defeat to Forest Green Rovers. Puddy injured himself in the FA Cup 4th qualifying round 4–2 victory over Bromley.

Sutton United
On 27 February 2017, Puddy joined Sutton United on an initial one-month loan deal as a direct replacement for injured first choice goalkeeper Ross Worner. He made his debut for the club on 28 February 2017, keeping a clean sheet during a 1–0 victory over Boreham Wood. Puddy kept a second clean sheet in his next match, a 0–0 draw with Barrow, Sutton's first away clean sheet back in the non-League top flight for 26 years since a 9–0 victory against Gateshead on 22 September 1990.

Career statistics

Honours
Salisbury City
Conference South play-offs: 2012–13

Bristol Rovers
Conference Premier play-offs: 2014–15
League Two Automatic Promotion: 2015–16

References

External links

1987 births
Living people
People from Warminster
English footballers
Association football goalkeepers
Bristol City F.C. players
Bath City F.C. players
Cheltenham Town F.C. players
Mangotsfield United F.C. players
Yate Town F.C. players
Stafford Rangers F.C. players
Tamworth F.C. players
Swindon Supermarine F.C. players
Chippenham Town F.C. players
Salisbury City F.C. players
Bristol Rovers F.C. players
Sutton United F.C. players
Hereford F.C. players
National League (English football) players
English Football League players
Southern Football League players
Braintree Town F.C. players